Zieleniec may refer to:
 Josef Zieleniec, a Czech Member of the European Parliament

and the following places in Poland:
 Zieleniec, a district of the town of Duszniki-Zdrój
 Zieleniec, a district of the town of Gorzów Wielkopolski
Zieleniec, Kuyavian-Pomeranian Voivodeship (north-central Poland)
Zieleniec, Łódź Voivodeship (central Poland)
Zieleniec, Lublin Voivodeship (east Poland)
Zieleniec, Gostynin County in Masovian Voivodeship (east-central Poland)
Zieleniec, Kozienice County in Masovian Voivodeship (east-central Poland)
Zieleniec, Węgrów County in Masovian Voivodeship (east-central Poland)
Zieleniec, Greater Poland Voivodeship (west-central Poland)
Zieleniec, Lubusz Voivodeship (west Poland)
Zieleniec, Opole Voivodeship (south-west Poland)
Zieleniec, Warmian-Masurian Voivodeship (north Poland)